General Gordon Forbes (1738 – 17 January 1828) was a senior officer in the British Army.

Early life

He was born the son of Laird Nathaniel Forbes, 1st of Auchernach into the Forbes family of Skellator, Aberdeenshire, Scotland and joined the British Army in 1756 as an ensign in the 33rd Regiment of Foot.

Military career

The following year he was made a lieutenant in the 2nd Battalion, promoted Captain in 1762 and served in Havannah. In 1764 he exchanged to the 34th Regiment of Foot based in Louisiana. He was raised to Major of the 9th Regiment of Foot in 1776 and took part in the disastrous 1777 Burgoyne Expedition into New York colony, where he was twice wounded.

In 1781, promoted to Lieut.-Colonel of the newly formed and short-lived 102nd Regiment of Foot, he sailed to the East Indies, where he was given the local rank of Colonel. After a brief spell in the 74th Regiment of Foot he became Colonel in 1794 of the 105th Regiment of Foot, which however soon disbanded. Promoted to Major General in the 81st Regiment of Foot he was in 1795 appointed Governor of Saint Nicolas Mole, a French settlement in St Domingo (now Haiti) which had surrendered to the British forces. Henry Dundas, 1st Viscount Melville, who was the Secretary of State for War to prime minister William Pitt the Younger, instructed Sir Adam Williamson, the lieutenant-governor of Jamaica, to sign an agreement with representatives of the French colonists that promised to restore the ancien regime, slavery and discrimination against mixed-race colonists, a move that drew criticism from abolitionists William Wilberforce and Thomas Clarkson. However, Toussaint L'Ouverture and his army of former enslaved people, under the command of Alexandre Petion, defeated the British forces.

He was appointed Colonel of the 81st Foot in 1797, but transferred to the Colonelcy of the 29th Regiment of Foot later that year. He was made Lieut.-General in 1801 and full General on 1 January 1812.

Death and family 

He died on 17 January 1828 in a house later known as Gordon House on Ham Common, London, and was buried nearby at St Peter's Church, Petersham.

He had married Margaret Sullivan of Cork, with whom he had five sons and five daughters. His eldest daughter Isabella married the writer Granville Penn in 1791 at All Saints Church, Kingston upon Thames. Another daughter, Maria, married in 1814 James Dawkins MP, a member of the Dawkins family which owned plantations and slaves in Jamaica.

References

|-

1738 births
1828 deaths
Scottish military personnel
People from Aberdeenshire
British Army generals
Highland Light Infantry officers
34th Regiment of Foot officers
Royal Norfolk Regiment officers
29th Regiment of Foot officers
Burials at St Peter's, Petersham